Hyphessobrycon togoi is a species of Hyphessobrycon found in tributaries of the Río de la Plata and the Salado River in Argentina. It lives in ponds, marshes and streams.

Description 
The basic body color is silver to shiny green, with a horizontal, green stripe from head to caudal fin. It differs from similar tetras in having a black humeral spot. In contrast to Hyphessobrycon langeanii, it has a second, smaller humeral spot more right. The female is slightly larger than the male.

Habitat 
The species inhabits extensive, plant-rich water-bodies. Compared with other species, it is not very common. It has also been found in the lagoons of Chascomús and Lobos, as well as in the Matanza River, a highly polluted stream.

References 

Characidae
Fauna of Argentina
Species described in 2006